Poompatta (Malayalam: പൂമ്പാറ്റ) is a Malayalam comic magazine started publishing in 1964. It was initially owned by P. A. Warrier and later by Sithara Publications and from 1978 by Pai and Pai Company (PAICO). Poompatta under PAICO was the first Malayalam children's publisher to syndicate comics produced by India Book House (Amar Chitra Katha) and publish Amar Chitra Katha in Malayalam.

Poompatta under PAICO is considered as "one of the pioneering children’s magazines in Malayalam". Before the rise of the Balarama magazine in the mid-1980s, it was the market leader and trendsetter among the Malayalam comic magazines. Prominent Malayalam children's authors such as N. M. Mohan (1978–82) and R. Gopalakrishnan (1982–1986) served as editors of the magazine in the 1980s (under publisher S. V. Pai).  

The magazine was later published by Manorajyam Group and also from Thrissur by Sooryaprabha Publications.

References

1964 establishments in Kerala
Biweekly magazines published in India
Children's magazines published in India
Indian comics
Magazines established in 1964
Malayalam comics
Malayalam-language magazines
Magazines about comics
Mass media in Kerala